Santa Fe is an impact crater in the Lunae Palus quadrangle of Mars, located at 19.5° North and 48.0° W.  It is 20.5 km in diameter and was named after Santa Fe, New Mexico, USA.

Impact craters generally have a rim with ejecta around them, in contrast volcanic craters usually do not have a rim or ejecta deposits.  As craters get larger (greater than 10 km in diameter) they usually have a central peak. The peak is caused by a rebound of the crater floor following the impact.

See also 
 Impact crater
 Impact event
 List of craters on Mars
 Ore resources on Mars
 Planetary nomenclature

References 

Lunae Palus quadrangle
Impact craters on Mars